Club Sport Estrella is a Peruvian football club, located in the city of Paita, Piura. The club was founded in 1922 and play in the Copa Perú which is the third division of the Peruvian league.

History 
In the 2016 Copa Perú, the club classified to the Departamental Stage, but was eliminated by Atlético Grau in the group stage.

In the 2017 Copa Perú, the club classified to the Departamental Stage, but was eliminated by Deportivo Monteverde in the second stage.

In the 2019 Copa Perú, the club classified to the Final Group Stage, but was eliminated when he finished in fourth place.

Honours

Regional 
Liga Departamental de Piura:
Runner-up (1): 2019

Liga Superior de Piura:
Runner-up (1): 2019

Liga Provincial de Paita:
Winners (2): 2016, 2017

Liga Distrital de Colán:
Winners (2): 2016, 2017

References

See also 
List of football clubs in Peru
Peruvian football league system

Football clubs in Peru
Association football clubs established in 1922
1922 establishments in Peru